John Watson Cox (16 September 1902–20 October 1984) was a New Zealand lawyer and town planning administrator. He was born in Taupiri, Waikato, New Zealand on 16 September 1902.

References

1902 births
1984 deaths
20th-century New Zealand lawyers